Plakias is a village on the south coast of the Greek island of Crete, in the Rethymno regional unit, about 21 kilometres south of the city of Rethymno. It is part of the municipality Agios Vasileios, and of the municipal unit Foinikas. It is surrounded by mountains to the north and the Libyan Sea to the south.
The name in Greek means "flat", because the town stands on an alluvial fan of material that has washed down the Kotsifou gorge directly to the north. 
This material has formed along the sea's edge into a long, fine, gold-hued sand beach, which shelves very gradually out into the bay, making it quite safe for swimming and hence, for family holidays.

Initially just a fishing jetty and a few houses, Plakias developed during the last few decades into a tourist resort. The first official mention of Plakias was in 1961, when it was recorded in a census as the permanent home of six fishermen. The recorded history of surrounding mountain villages like Myrthios and Sellia goes back to the 10th century, when the Byzantine Emperor Nikephoros II Phokas (961 AD) built roads and bridges in order to link those villages, and there are some fragments of wall remaining from a fortified area on a hill top just northeast of the present main town.
The local area is geographically suitable for a settlement, having plenty of agricultural space, and there may well have been a settlement there since Minoan times.

Plakias has a 1300-metre-long sandy beach and there are several other beaches within walking distance (Souda, Damnoni, Ammoudi, and Skhinaria). The southeastern end of the beach, near the Kakomouri headland, is used by nudists. The town is not on any major passage for traffic and hence traffic is minimal and it is quieter and less dusty than many other Greek resorts.

Parking along the main town road is difficult in the high season, but there is a large free-parking area just east of the main town. There are plenty of places to eat along the sea front, with the biggest cluster of tavernas at the west end. 8 kilometers to the east is the historic monastery of Preveli, which may have been founded as early as the 10th century. Due to its isolated position, it has played an important role in Cretan revolts against occupying forces such as the Nazis in World War II. Near the monastery and in a short distance from Plakias is the Preveli Beach. This is a very beautiful spot, where there is a forest with palm trees, in a gorge with a river and a beautiful beach.
The area is accessible from the port of Plakias.

Plakias is home to the "Youth Hostel Plakias", set in olive groves behind the town, which is famous among international backpackers as the 'most southerly hostel' in Europe. Also well-known are the cafes "Nufaro", (known locally as "Joe's bar") and the bars "Ostraco" and "Cozy Backyard". "World International Tourism Day" is celebrated each September with a big evening festival, with a free buffet meal and free traditional music, songs, and dancing performances in the main square.

There are two roads leading to Plakias through the mountain range that lies to the north, both of which run through spectacular gorges—to the north of Plakias, the Kotsifos Gorge, and to the northeast, the Kourtaliotiko Gorge. A good coastal motor track runs west beyond Souda to Rodakino beach, Frangokastello and Sfakiá. There are plenty of walks locally, and bolder walkers will enjoy the high green countryside beyond the coastal mountain range north of town. Scuba diving and snorkeling are popular activities in the area, with a number of diving schools to choose from. Mountain biking and cycle touring are other local attractions.

There are several buses daily to and from Rethymnon bus station; some of these go via Preveli Monastery. The Plakias bus stop is on the seafront taxi rank.

External links

What to do in Plakias
All about Plakias and surroundings
Plakias on Interkriti
Plakias Photo Album
Youth Hostel Plakias
Welcome to Plakias
Plakias forum
Activities in Plakias

Populated places in Rethymno (regional unit)